Burning: A Wish is the fourth album by the German band Lacrimas Profundere.

Track listing

Personnel
 Christopher Schmid: Vocals
 Oliver Nikolas Schmid: Lead Guitars
 Marco Praschberger: Rhythm Guitars
 Rico Galvagno: Bass
 Willi Wurm: Drums
 Christian Steiner: Keyboards

References

2001 albums
Lacrimas Profundere albums
Napalm Records albums